Tuvana-i-Colo is an uninhabited atoll in the southeastern part of the island state of Fiji in the Pacific Ocean. It is the second most southern atoll of the Lau archipelago and represents Fiji's third most southern landmass. It is located about 25 km south of Ono-i-Lau, the southernmost inhabited Fijian atoll, and 8 kilometres east-northeast of the neighboring atoll Tuvana-i-Ra. It is completely surrounded by a fringing reef.

History
The island was sighted in 1820 by the Russian explorer Fabian Gottlieb von Bellingshausen and named "Siminov” (after the astronomer Ivan Mikhailovich Simonov who was on expedition with him).

See also

 Desert island
 List of islands

References

Islands of Fiji
Lau Islands